Hořovice is a town in Beroun District in the Central Bohemian Region of the Czech Republic. It has about 6,900 inhabitants.

Administrative parts
Hořovice is made up of only one administrative part.

Geography
It lies in the Hořovice Uplands. The Červený Stream flows through the town.

History

Hořovice was founded between 1303 and 1322, however archaeological excavations proves existence of an early settlement already in the 10th century. There was a trading post, later rebuilt and expanded into a castle in the Gothic style (the so-called "Old Castle").

Due to frequent fires in the town (in 1540, 1590, 1624, 1639, 1690 and 1694) and reconstructions, almost all documents of Gothic and Renaissance architecture were destroyed.

The construction of the Bohemian Western Railroad in around 1862 contributed to the development of industry. Gradually, the traditional handicraft nail production disappeared, and was replaced by machine production in the newly established factories. Thanks to the rich deposits in the area, iron ore has been processed here since the 14th century. Cast iron has made the area famous since the 18th century. Stoves, grilles, railings, reliefs and busts were cast in the local foundries.

Jewish legacy

One of the most worldwide spread Jewish surname Horovitz/Horowitz/Gurvich/Hurwicz/Hurwitz/Horvitz, etc., originates from the town of Hořovice, which during the late Middle Ages had one of the most substantial Jewish populations in the Bohemian Kingdom and rabbis and communal leaders such as Isaiah Horowitz or Shabtai Sheftel Horowitz traced their lineage from this town.

Demographics

Sights

Hořovice is known for the Hořovice Castle, a national cultural monument. The so-called New Castle was built in 1680–1709. It contains the adjacent French-English park and it is open to the public. The Old Castle houses the Police of the Czech Republic, the Municipal Library and the Information Centre, and offices of a family centre and of the Museum of the Bohemian Karst. A gallery and exposition of Hořovice Region Museum are also located there.

The second historic centre is Palackého Square with its surroundings. The Baroque Church of the Holy Trinity was built in 1674. The town hall is a Neo-Renaissance building from 1905.

Notable people

Elizabeth of Görlitz (1390–1451), Duchess of Luxemburg
Josel of Rosheim (1480–1554), advocate of the German Jews; lived here
Josef Labor (1842–1924), musician
Alfred Seifert (1850–1901), Czech-German painter; grew up here
Jaroslav Panuška (1872–1958), painter and illustrator
Otto Hönigschmid (1878–1945), chemist
Libor Capalini (born 1973), modern pentathlete, Olympic medalist
Jan Prušinovský (born 1979), director and screenwriter
Jiří Fischer (born 1980), ice hockey player
Jan Skopeček (born 1980), politician
Petr Koukal (born 1985), badminton player

Twin towns – sister cities

Hořovice is twinned with:
 Gau-Algesheim, Germany

References

External links

Populated places in the Beroun District
Cities and towns in the Czech Republic
Historic Jewish communities in Europe